Alexander Alexandrovich Bessmertnykh (born 10 November 1933) is a Soviet diplomat who briefly served as foreign minister of the Soviet Union.

Early life
Bessmertnykh was born in Biisk in 1933, first of four children. He lost his father when he was 10 years old.

Career
Bessmertnykh joined the ministry of foreign affairs in 1957. From 1970 to 1983 he served as a consul at the Soviet embassy in the United States, and then headed the US department in the foreign ministry. In 1986, he was appointed deputy foreign minister and in 1988, he became first deputy foreign minister. From 1990 to 1991 he was ambassador to the United States.

Soviet Foreign Minister

He briefly served as a Minister of Foreign Affairs of the USSR in 1991, replacing Eduard Shevardnadze, being approved by the Supreme Soviet of the Soviet Union, 421 voted in favour, 3 against, and 10 abstained. During the August coup of 1991 he did not lend his support to the attempt at removing Gorbachev from power, but refused to condemn the plotters. For supporting the GKChP, the government of Valentin Pavlov was dismissed and, accordingly, Bessmertnykh lost the post of Minister.

References

External links 

 MGIMO Alumni Association. Alexander Bessmertnykh profile 
 GlobalZero.org. Biography of Alexander Bessmertnykh 
 Биографические сведения на pseudology.org 
 

1933 births
Living people
People from Biysk
Ambassadors of the Soviet Union to the United States
Central Committee of the Communist Party of the Soviet Union members
Soviet Ministers of Foreign Affairs